Schylander is a surname. Notable people with the surname include:

 Caleb Schylander (1895–1977), Swedish footballer
 Carl Schylander (1748–1811), Swedish stage actor
 Maria Schylander (born 1973), Swedish biathlete